The 2023 season is Malmö FF's 112th in existence, their 88th season in Allsvenskan and their 23st consecutive season in the league. They are competing in Allsvenskan, the 2022–23 Svenska Cupen and the 2023–24 Svenska Cupen.

Players

Squad

Players in/out

In

Out

Player statistics

Appearances and goals

Competitions

Allsvenskan

League table

Results summary

Results by round

Matches

Svenska Cupen
Kickoff times are in UTC+1 unless stated otherwise.

2022–23
The tournament continued from the 2022 season.

Group stage

Knockout stage

2022–23

Qualification stage

Non-competitive

Pre-season
Kickoff times are in UTC+1 unless stated otherwise.

Footnotes

External links

  

Malmö FF
Malmö FF seasons
Malmo